Piltene Parish is an administrative unit of the Ventspils Municipality, Latvia. The parish has a population of 559 (as of 1/07/2010) and covers an area of 187.856 km2.

Villages of Piltene Parish 
 Bestes
 Branči
 Dziļgu ciems
 Gārzde
 Jaunzemji 
 Karaļciems
 Lagzdiena
 Landze
 Ūdrande
 Vecmuižciems
 Zūru mežniecība

Parishes of Latvia
Ventspils Municipality